This page lists the albums that reached number one on the overall Top R&B/Hip-Hop Albums chart, the R&B Albums chart (introduced in 2013), and the Rap Albums chart in 2014. The R&B Albums and Rap Albums charts serve as partial distillations of the overall R&B/Hip-Hop Albums chart.

Note that Billboard publishes charts with an issue date approximately 7–10 days in advance.

List of number ones

See also 
2014 in music
List of Billboard 200 number-one albums of 2014
List of number-one R&B/hip-hop songs of 2014 (U.S.)

References 

2014
2014
United States RandB Hip Hop Albums